Meet David Sedaris is a BBC Radio 4 radio program featuring American humorist David Sedaris reading new and previously collected stories live before an audience. There have been seven series with the first being broadcast in April 2010. Each episode runs for thirty minutes with some episodes featuring questions taken from the audience or diary extracts to fill in the time.

Repeats have also been broadcast on BBC Radio 4 Extra.

Episodes

Series 1
Episode 1 Six-to-Eight Black Men; Just a Quick Email
Episode 2 Let It Snow; The Cat and the Baboon; Keeping Up
Episode 3 Picapocketoni; I'll Eat What He's Wearing
Episode 4 Kookabura; With a Pal Like This...

Series 2
Episode 1 The Incomplete Quad (previously unrecorded); The Squirrel and the Chipmunk
Episode 2 Me Talk Pretty One Day; It's Catching
Episode 3 Nuit of the Living Dead; The End of the Affair
Episode 4 Us and Them; selected diary extracts
Episode 5 Memento Mori; The Motherless Bear
Episode 6 The Ship Shape; Make That a Double

Series 3
Episode 1 Attaboy; In the Waiting Room
Episode 2 Author, Author; Front Row Centre with Thaddeus Bristol (previously unrecorded)
Episode 3 Memory Lapse, If I Ruled the World
Episode 4 Put a Lid on It
Episode 5 Easy Tiger, Possession
Episode 6 Rubbish, Jesus Shaves

Series 4
Episode 1 The Happy Place (previously unrecorded); The Shadow of Your Smile (previously unrecorded)
Episode 2 Repeat After Me
Episode 3 #2 to Go; Innocents Abroad
Episode 4 Company Man; Diary Extracts (previously unrecorded) 
Episode 5 English Lesson; Understanding Understanding Owls
Episode 6 The Sea Section (previously unrecorded); Dog Days (previously unrecorded)

Series 5
Episode 1 The Understudy; Big Boy (previously unrecorded)
Episode 2 Stepping Out (previously unrecorded); The Vigilant Rabbit
Episode 3 Leviathan (previously unrecorded)
Episode 4 Little Guy; Now Hiring Friendly People; The Ones That Got Away
Episode 5 Calypso (previously unrecorded); Follow Me (previously unrecorded)
Episode 6 Loggerheads

Series 6
Episode 1 04/07/2017
Episode 2 Of Mice and Men; A Can of Worms
Episode 3 Suitable for Framing; Diary Extracts
Episode 4 Buddy, Can You Spare a Tie?; A Modest Proposal
Episode 5 A Number of Reasons I've Been Depressed, Lately; Diary Extracts
Episode 6 The Perfect Fit; Audience Q&A

Series 7
Episode 1 Father Time; Diary Extracts
Episode 2 The Godfather; Diary Extracts; Audience Q&A
Episode 3 The Silent Treatment; Diary Extracts
Episode 4 Why Aren’t You Laughing?
Episode 5 Active Shooter; Diary Extracts
Episode 6 CNN; Boo Hooey; Million Dollar Ideas

Multimedia
Series one, two and three were released by Audible as audiobooks on the 23 April 2013. Series four was made available on the 22 January 2014. The fifth series was published on 30 June 2016. The sixth series was released on the 4 January 2018. The seventh series was released on 5 December 2019.

References

External links

BBC Radio 4 programmes